Deanes is a restaurant located in Belfast, Northern Ireland with a European kitchen style. It is a fine dining restaurant that was awarded a Michelin star for each year in the period 1998–2010.

It lost its star in 2011 due to severe frost damage in 2010, that forced a temporary closure of the restaurant, just in the period the inspections for the next year's guide were to take place.

Its predecessor Deanes on the Square held a Michelin star in 1997.

The executive chef is Michael Deane and the head chef is Simon Toye.

Gallery

See also
 List of Michelin starred restaurants in Ireland

Sources and references

External links
 
 Ireland Guide

Restaurants in Northern Ireland
Michelin Guide starred restaurants in Ireland